Lissonotus bisignatus is a species of beetle in the family Cerambycidae. It was described by Dupont in 1836.

References

Cerambycinae
Beetles described in 1836